Children of the Damned is a 1964 British black-and-white science fiction horror film, a thematic sequel to 1960s Village of the Damned, which concerns a group of children with similar psi-powers to those in the earlier film. The film enables an interpretation of the children as being a good and more pure form of human being, rather than evil and alien.

Plot 

Six children are identified by a team of UNESCO researchers investigating child development. The children have extraordinary powers of intellect and are all able to complete a difficult brick puzzle in exactly the same amount of time.

British psychologist Tom Lewellin (Ian Hendry) and geneticist David Neville (Alan Badel) are interested in Paul, a London boy whose mother Diana (Sheila Allen) clearly hates the child and insists she was never touched by a man. This is initially dismissed as hysteria and it is implied she has 'loose' morals. But after a while, the two men realize that all six children were born without fathers and are also capable of telepathy.

The children, from various countries – China, India, Nigeria, the Soviet Union, the United States, and the United Kingdom – are brought to London for a collective study into their advanced intelligence; however, the children escape from their embassies and gather at an abandoned church in Southwark, London. They intermittently take mental control of Paul's aunt (Ferris) to help them survive in the derelict church. Meanwhile, the military debates whether or not to destroy them. The children have demonstrated the capacity for telekinesis and construct a complex machine which uses sonic waves as a defensive weapon, which kills several government officials and soldiers. But the military realizes that they only fight back when attacked. After psychologist Tom Lewellin makes a passionate plea asking the group to return to their respective embassies, the children obey and murder embassy and military officials before returning to the church.

Lewellin urges the government to give the children leeway; however, his team of scientists observe the difference between an ordinary human blood cell and the cells of one of the children, thereby implying the children to be non-human, and destined to become a threat to the human race.

When authorities try to take control of the children, they are forced to protect themselves. As the situation escalates into a final showdown between the military and the children, one of the scientists postulates that the judgment of the children being alien was incorrect, and that the children's cells are in fact human, advanced by a million years. Meanwhile, the children also imply they have arrived at the decision their presence is incompatible with that of basic humans, and therefore they intend to lower their defences and sacrifice themselves. The military commander recognizes a mistake has been made, and aborts the attack command; however, the command is triggered accidentally by a screwdriver – one of the simplest of basic man's machines. The church is destroyed, and the children are killed.

Cast

Critical reception 

Howard Thompson in The New York Times in late January 1964 considered it: "a dull, pretentious successor to that marvelous little chiller of several seasons ago, Village of the Damned. What a comedown."

Time Out called the sequel a "fairly intriguing and atmospheric exercise in science fiction."

References

External links 
 
 
 
 

1964 films
1964 horror films
1960s horror thriller films
1960s science fiction horror films
British black-and-white films
British science fiction horror films
British sequel films
Films scored by Ron Goodwin
Films based on science fiction novels
Metro-Goldwyn-Mayer films
Village of the Damned films
Films with screenplays by John Briley
Films shot at MGM-British Studios
1960s English-language films
Films about children
1960s British films